Cinzia Zuffada (born 1956) is an Italian-American engineer who is the Associate Chief Scientist at the Jet Propulsion Laboratory. Her role considers the strategic planning of scientific programs for JPL and the development of reflectometry technologies for Global navigation satellite systems. She is the chair of the Board of the Italian Scientists & Scholars in North America Foundation.

Early life and education 
Zuffada was born in Broni. She studied electronic engineering at the University of Pavia. She remained at Pavia for her doctoral research. After graduating, she worked on Electromagnetic Fields Theory as postdoctoral research fellow. In 1985, she moved to the United States, where she worked as an Associate Senior Engineer at the Kaman Sciences Corporation. She joined the California Institute of Technology as a postdoctoral researcher.

Research and career 
Zuffada joined the Jet Propulsion Laboratory in 1992. Her early research considered the development of numerical methods to solve electromagnetic scattering problems, making use of supercomputers. She was made Associate Chief Scientist in 2007.

At JPL, Zuffada was made responsible for the development of reflectometry technologies for Global navigation satellite systems (GNSS). She has shown that GNSS is relevant for environmental monitoring, including ocean altimetry and hydrology (HydroGNSS). She performed the first high-precision altimetric measurements using Global Positioning System, showing that it was possible to measure surface height of the Crater Lake to 2 cm accuracy. In particular, she is responsible for the cyclone GNSS (CYGNSS) mission, which looks to improve hurricane forecasting. It works by collecting reflected GNSS data and mapping peak reflected power. This reflected power is impacted by the presence of water and vegetation. The maps can provide dynamic information about moving weather systems. CYGNSS is currently involved with missions measuring tropical cyclones. She was promoted to Acting Chief Scientist in 2016. In this capacity she oversees strategic planning for science and manages investment in research and development.

Zuffada is interested in increasing research collaborations between the United States and Rome. She was made chair of the Board of the Italian Scientists & Scholars in North America Foundation in 2017.

Awards and honors 
 2002 University of Pavia Teresian Medal 
 2014 Jet Propulsion Laboratory Magellan Award
 2015 NASA Exceptional Scientific Achievement Medal
 2016 Knighthood of the Order of Merit of Italy
 2019 Ghislieri Life Achievement
 2019 Embassy of the United States, Rome Science Fellow

Selected publications

References

American people of Italian descent
Italian scientists
Italian women scientists
University of Pavia alumni
Italian astrophysicists
1956 births
Living people
Jet Propulsion Laboratory faculty